The Helplessness Blues Tour was a world tour by Seattle folk band Fleet Foxes in support of their second album Helplessness Blues which was released on May 3, 2011. The tour visited North America, Europe, Oceania and Japan.

Background
The Tour began in the band home town of Seattle, Washington before moving across the United States and Canada. A European leg was then announced which began in Berlin, Germany. This leg included three sold out shows at London's Hammersmith Apollo. A second North American leg took place July 14 and July 24, 2011 with another European leg taking place from August 11–20. The Band performed at some of Europe's best known Festivals including the Glastonbury Festival and Rock Werchter. The fifth leg of the tour began with two shows at Seattle's Paramount Theatre, followed by a string of shows in the United States. A Third European leg took place in November–December 2011 before moving onto Australia for some festival shows. A short Japanese leg also took place in January 2012. Two New Zealand shows were announced on September 5. Australian headline shows were also announced for January 2012.

Example set list
"The Cascades"
"Grown Ocean"
"Drops in the River"
"Battery Kinzie"
"Bedouin Dress"
"Sim Sala Bim"
"Mykonos"
"Your Protector"
"Tiger Mountain Peasant Song"
"White Winter Hymnal"
"Ragged Wood"
"Lorelai"
"Montezuma"
"He Doesn't Know Why"
"The Shrine/An Argument"
"Blue Spotted Tail"
"Blue Ridge Mountains"
Encore
"Oliver James"
"Helplessness Blues"
Source:

Support acts
 The Cave Singers  (Leg 1, North America—select dates)
 The Bees (Leg 2 & 4, Europe—select dates)
 Owen Pallett (Leg 2, Europe—select dates)
 Alela Diane (Leg 3, North America)
 The Walkmen (Leg 5, North America—select dates)
 Bon Iver (Leg 5, North America—select dates)
 Van Dyke Parks (Leg 5, North America—select dates)
 Vetiver (Leg 6, Europe—select dates)

Tour dates

Festivals and other miscellaneous performances

 A^This show was part of the Primavera Festival.
 B^This show was part of the Glastonbury Festival.
 C^This show was part of the Coors Light Open House Festival.
 D^This show was part of the Live at the Marquee (festival).
 E^This show was part of the Eden Sessions.
 F^This show was part of the Rock Werchter Festival.
 G^This show was part of the Malta Festival.
 H^This show was part of the Optimus Alive! Festival.
 I^This show was part of the Ruisrock Festival.
 J^This show was part of the Pitchfork Music Festival.

 K^This show is part of the Øyafestivalen.
 L^This show is part of the Way Out West Festival.
 M^This show is part of the Haldern Pop Festival.
 N^This show is part of the La Route du Rock Festival.
 O^This show is part of the Pukkelpop Festival.
 P^This show is part of the Lowlands Festival.
 Q^This show is part of the Green Man Festival.
 R^This show is part of the Austin City Limits Music Festival.
 S^These shows are part of the Falls Festival.
 T^These shows are part of the Southbound Festival.

Box office score data

Fleet Foxes
Robin Pecknold: lead vocals, guitar
Skyler Skjelset: lead guitar, mandolin
Christian Wargo: bass guitar, vocals
Casey Wescott: Keyboard, mandolin, vocals
Joshua Tillman: drums, vocals, arrangements
Morgan Henderson: multi-instrumentalist, arrangements

References

External links
Official Tour Page

2011 concert tours
2012 concert tours